The Pale-faced Clubskimmer (Brechmorhoga mendax) is a dragonfly of the family Libellulidae.
Total length is 52 to 64mm.

References

External links
 Brechmorhoga mendax on BugGuide.Net

Libellulidae
Insects described in 1861